= Germain Joseph Hallez =

Belgian painter

Germain Joseph Hallez (1769–1840) was a Belgian painter.
